Sébastien Berthelot (born 29 May 1986) is a French judoka.

Achievements

References

1986 births
Living people
French male judoka
Place of birth missing (living people)
21st-century French people